Walk the Sky is the sixth studio album by American rock band Alter Bridge, released on October 18, 2019 via Napalm Records. It was produced by the band's longtime collaborator Michael Baskette, who has produced all of the band's albums since 2007's Blackbird. The album's first single, "Wouldn't You Rather", was released on June 28, 2019. A second single, "Pay No Mind", was released on July 25, 2019, with four further singles, "Take the Crown", "In the Deep", "Dying Light", and "Godspeed" later released. The album's cover art was designed by Dan Tremonti, brother of guitarist Mark Tremonti; its packaging was designed by Sturge Media and Janus Music Mgmt. Along with the announcement of the album's release, it was also revealed that the band would embark on a European tour with Shinedown, Sevendust and the Raven Age towards the end of 2019.

A deluxe edition of the album, titled Walk the Sky 2.0, was announced on September 15, 2020 and due out on November 6, 2020 via Napalm Records. The seven-track EP consists of a brand new song, "Last Rites", plus six live favourites from Walk the Sky.

It was named one of the 50 best rock albums of 2019 by Loudwire.

Background
Walk the Sky was recorded from the beginning of March through to May 2019. This album was recorded differently from the band's previous record due to scheduling constraints, with vocalist Myles Kennedy and guitarist Mark Tremonti sharing their own song ideas, which were then moulded into shape alongside bassist Brian Marshall and drummer Scott Phillips. On previous albums, Kennedy and Tremonti would combine ideas and riffs with producer Michael Baskette.

"It's kinda like a John Carpenter movie — this old-school synth-wave kind of vibe," Tremonti explained in a 2019 interview with Kerrang! "Somebody might hear the record and have no idea that was intended, but for a batch of songs, I tapped into some old loops that I either created or found randomly online, and worked with them in the background to inspire me to go in a different direction. I loved working like that. We challenge ourselves to not repeat ourselves and find new inspiration to add a different layer to what we do. It's particularly challenging when you've had so many records, but when I showed Myles what I was thinking, he absolutely loved it and was on board right away."

Track listing

Personnel
Alter Bridge
Myles Kennedy – lead vocals, rhythm and lead guitar, backing vocals on "Forever Falling"
Mark Tremonti – lead and rhythm guitar, backing vocals, lead vocals on "Forever Falling", custom synths
Brian Marshall – bass guitar
Scott Phillips – drums, percussion, keyboards

Production
Michael Baskette – producer, mixing
Jef Moll – digital editing
Brad Blackwood – mastering

Artwork
Daniel Tremonti – cover art
Dan Sturge – photos
Janus Music Mgmt. - packaging and layout

Charts

References

External links
 Official band website

2019 albums
Alter Bridge albums
Napalm Records albums
Albums produced by Michael Baskette